Benjamin Thomas Chu (born 3 March 1932) is a Chinese-born American chemist.

Chu received his secondary education at schools in Shanghai and Hong Kong. He moved to the United States in 1953 to attended St. Norbert College on scholarship. Chu earned a doctorate in radiochemistry from Cornell University in 1959, and started work as a research associate of Peter Debye. Chu began his teaching career at the University of Kansas in 1962. He joined the State University of New York at Stony Brook faculty in 1968. That same year, he was awarded a Guggenheim Fellowship. Chu was named a leading professor of chemistry in 1988, and appointed to a distinguished professorship in 1992. Chu has received the Humboldt Research Award twice, in 1976 and 1992, and was elected fellow of the American Physical Society in 1992.

References

1932 births
20th-century American chemists
21st-century American chemists
Chinese emigrants to the United States
Cornell University alumni
Fellows of the American Physical Society
Humboldt Research Award recipients
Living people
St. Norbert College alumni
Stony Brook University faculty
University of Kansas faculty